Rami Yacoub (born 17 January 1975), also known by the mononym Rami, is a Swedish record producer and songwriter and former member of the songwriting/production houses Cheiron Studios and Maratone. Yacoub collaborated extensively with Max Martin in the early part of his career. He has worked with acts such as Lady Gaga, Ariana Grande, Demi Lovato, Selena Gomez, Britney Spears, Nicki Minaj, Madonna, Charli XCX, Bon Jovi, Backstreet Boys, One Direction, Arashi, Westlife, The Saturdays, P!nk, Celine Dion, Enrique Iglesias, Tiësto, Avicii, NSYNC, 5 Seconds of Summer, Lindsay Lohan, Weezer and Måneskin.

Biography
Rami, born to Palestinian parents, began his music career at the age of 13 when he began playing bass in a band in Stockholm.

His talent for songwriting was already in evidence as he wrote many of the group's songs. Yacoub had also a short singing career but then decided to give all his attention to writing and producing instead. By 18 he had discovered production when, with the aid of a "sampler, a little mixing board, synthesizers", he began doing remixes.

In 1998, he was approached by Max Martin, who was looking for a new production partner, and asked to join the legendary Cheiron Studios in Stockholm. Rami's first collaboration with Martin was producing the hit "...Baby One More Time" that launched the career of Britney Spears.

Following ten years of service, Rami split amicably from Maratone in early 2008 because he felt that "he needed to go [his] own way." After taking several years off to take a breather and to assess what he wanted to do next, he began putting together his own production group based at his Kinglet Studios in Los Angeles and Stockholm, Sweden.

Influences 
Rami Yacoub has said that growing up he listened to The Beatles, Prince, and Tom Jones. Other acts including Motley Crue, AC/DC, Iron Maiden also had huge impacts. He considers Denniz Pop his music industry "Godfather" and personal mentor.

References

External links
 Official Cheiron Studios website archived
 Max Martin Fansite: Rami Yacoub page
 Interview, HitQuarters Aug 2009

Swedish record producers
Swedish songwriters
Living people
1975 births
Swedish people of Palestinian descent
Place of birth missing (living people)